The 1992–93 Croatian Second Football League was the second season of second-division football in Croatia, and the first season to be played in a fall-spring format. NK Dubrava and NK Primorac won the north and south groups, respectively, and were granted licenses to participate the top flight 1993-94 1.HNL.

North Group "Sjever"
NK Dubrava were promoted. NK Samobor finished third after receiving a new sponsor, the team's second highest league finish of all time.

South Group "Jug"

References 

Druga HNL
First Football League (Croatia) seasons
Cro